The 1959 Scottish Cup Final was an association football match between St Mirren F.C. and Aberdeen F.C. on 25 April 1959 at Hampden Park in Glasgow, Scotland. It was 73rd staging of the final of the Scottish Cup, Scotland's most prestigious cup competition. It was Aberdeen's fifth appearance in the final of the competition whilst St Mirren were competing for the fourth time.

Route to the final

Aberdeen 
Aberdeen entered the competition in the first round. They began their campaign against Second Division side East Fife at Pittodrie Stadium. The match ended in a 2−1 win for Aberdeen. In the second round Aberdeen faced another Second Division club, Arbroath, also at home with Aberdeen winning 3−0. In the quarter-final the club was drawn against St Johnstone of Perth who also competed in the Second Division. Aberdeen won 2−1 away at Muirton Park to progress to the quarter-final stage. The opposition was Kilmarnock who were beaten 3−1. In the semi-finals Aberdeen faced Third Lanark at the neutral venue of Ibrox Park in Glasgow which resulted in a 1−1 draw. It took a 1−0 win in a replay for Aberdeen to progress to the final for the fifth time in the club's history.

St Mirren

St Mirren entered the competition in the second round. They began their campaign against non-league club Peebles Rovers which resulted in a 10−0 thrashing by the Paisley club. St Mirren then faced Motherwell of the First Division with St Mirren winning 3−2. The club then faced fellow First Division club Dunfermline Athletic at home in the quarter-final, producing a 2−1 win to progress to the semi-final stage. Celtic were the opposition faced in the semi-final with St Mirren winning 4−0 at Hampden Park to reach the Scottish Cup Final for a fourth time.

Match details

Teams

References

External links
 Video highlights from official Pathé News archive

1959
Cup Final
Scottish Cup Final 1959
Scottish Cup Final 1959
Scottish Cup Final
1950s in Glasgow